Stephen Kovacevich (born October 17, 1940) is an American classical pianist and conductor. He is particularly celebrated for his recordings of works by Beethoven, Bartók and Schubert, and is known for technical skill, clarity of playing and an intelligent approach to interpretation.

Biography
Stephen Kovacevich was born in San Pedro, Los Angeles, California, to a Croatian father and an American mother. When his mother remarried, his name was changed to Stephen Bishop, the name under which he performed in his early career. He later discovered that he was often being confused with the singer and guitarist Stephen Bishop. To avoid the confusion, he began performing as Stephen Bishop-Kovacevich and later simply as Stephen Kovacevich.

He made his concert debut as a pianist at the age of 11; then, at the age of 18 he moved to London to study under Dame Myra Hess on a scholarship and has been a London resident ever since, currently living in Hampstead. In 1961 he made a sensational European debut at the Wigmore Hall, playing the Sonata by Alban Berg, three Bach Preludes and Fugues and Beethoven's Diabelli Variations. He also toured Britain with Jacqueline du Pré. In 1967, he made his New York debut and since then he has toured Europe, the United States, the Far East, Australia, New Zealand and South America. As a soloist and conductor, he has frequently performed and recorded works by, amongst others, Mozart, Beethoven, Schubert, Brahms and Bartók. In more recent years, he has performed works by Rachmaninoff.

Kovacevich often performs chamber works; his chamber music partners have included Jacqueline du Pré, Martha Argerich, Steven Isserlis, Nigel Kennedy, Lynn Harrell, Sarah Chang, Gautier Capuçon, Renaud Capuçon and Emmanuel Pahud.

Aside from his performing career, Kovacevich has given master classes and recitals at Dartington International Summer School for many years.

Personal life 

From 1961 to 1967 Kovacevich was married to novelist and psychotherapist Bernardine Bishop née Wall, who died in 2013. They had two sons, Matt Bishop and Foff Bishop.

Kovacevich had a relationship with pianist Martha Argerich, with whom he still performs. They have one daughter, Stéphanie.

References

External links
 , WNCN-FM, May 6, 1983

1940 births
Living people
American classical pianists
Male classical pianists
American male pianists
American people of Croatian descent
20th-century American pianists
21st-century classical pianists
20th-century American male musicians
21st-century American male musicians
21st-century American pianists